The 2008 Eurocup Formula Renault 2.0 season was the eighteenth Eurocup Formula Renault 2.0 season. The season began at Circuit de Spa-Francorchamps on May 3 and finished at the Circuit de Catalunya on October 19, after fourteen rounds. Four drivers went into the final meeting with a shot of winning the title, with Valtteri Bottas coming out on top, to claim his second title in the year.

Teams and drivers

Calendar

Championship standings

Drivers
Points are awarded to the drivers as follows:

* - only awarded to race one polesitters

† — Drivers did not finish the race, but were classified as they completed over 90% of the race distance.

 Christopher Zanella race as guest driver with Race Performance at the Hungaroring.

Teams

References

External links
 Official website of the Eurocup Formula Renault 2.0 championship

Eurocup
Eurocup Formula Renault
Renault Eurocup